Can't Stop Dancing is a 1999 feature-length film written and directed by Steven Falick and Ben Zook and starring Ben Zook. The film showed at the 1999 Palm Springs International Film Festival.

Plot
Randy Rubio, a  leader of a small-time dance troupe, learns that their fifteen-year run at a Kansas theme park is coming to an end.  So they pack their bus and move to Hollywood, where Randy's convinced fame and fortune await them.

References

External links

1999 films
1999 comedy films
American comedy films
1990s English-language films
1990s American films